Hendrikus ("Henk") Johannes Bosveld (July 10, 1941 – August 6, 1998) was a Dutch football midfielder, who was nicknamed Charly after Charles Chaplin due to a similar style of walking.

Club career
Born in Velp, he started playing football at local side VVO and was named best player of Vitesse in the twentieth century. He also played for Sportclub Enschede and Sparta and retired from professional football on June 12, 1979.

International career
Bosveld made his debut for the Netherlands in an October 1962 friendly match against Belgium. He won his second and final cap in an April 1964 friendly against Austria.

Death and legacy
He died in 1998 in Arnhem from a myocardial infarction, aged 57. The East Stand at Vitesse's GelreDome was named in his honour in 2016.

References

External links
 
  Profile - Vitesse 
 60 Jaar Betaald Voetbal profile - NOS 

1941 births
1998 deaths
People from Rheden
Association football midfielders
Dutch footballers
Netherlands international footballers
Eredivisie players
Sportclub Enschede players
Sparta Rotterdam players
SBV Vitesse players
Dutch football managers
SBV Vitesse managers
Footballers from Gelderland